Charlie Leaeno (born 15 February 1985) is an American Samoan professional rugby league footballer who plays for the Lithgow Workies in the Group 10 competition. Leaeno has previously played with the Wakefield Trinity Wildcats in the Super League, the Canterbury-Bankstown Bulldogs in the National Rugby League and the St. George Illawarra Dragons and the Newtown Jets in the NSW Cup also had a stint with the Parramatta Two Blues in rugby union.

Rugby League Career
In 2007, Leaeno made his first grade début in the National Rugby League with the St George Illawarra Dragons, playing six matches in the year. In 2008, he joined Canterbury-Bankstown, staying with the club for two seasons.

Super League
In 2010, Leaeno signed with the Wakefield Trinity Wildcats in the Super League. It was confirmed that Leaeno would make his début for the Wakefield Trinity Wildcats against the Wigan Warriors on 13 June after being selected in the 19-man squad. Leaeno quickly became a big hit with the Wakefield Trinity Wildcats fans was given the nickname "Grond".

Return to Australia
Without able to re-join the National Rugby League after his stint in the Super League, Leaeno joined the Kingsgrove Colts in the Ron Massey Cup, a lower based competition in New South Wales.

Representative career
Leaeno was selected to play for Samoa in 2005.

References

External links
Bulldogs profile

1985 births
American Samoan rugby league players
Samoa national rugby league team players
St. George Illawarra Dragons players
Canterbury-Bankstown Bulldogs players
Wakefield Trinity players
Rugby league props
Samoan rugby league players
American expatriate rugby league players
Expatriate rugby league players in England
Expatriate rugby league players in Australia
American Samoan expatriate sportspeople in England
American Samoan expatriate sportspeople in Australia
Living people